Acrotaeniostola is a genus of tephritid  or fruit flies in the family Tephritidae.

Species
Pseudopolionota radians Lima, 1935

References

Tephritinae
Tephritidae genera
Diptera of South America